Cary is a surname. Notable people with the surname include:

Alexander Cary, Master of Falkland (born 1963), son of Lucius Cary, 15th Viscount Falkland
Alice Cary (1820–1871), American poet
Annie Louise Cary  (1842–1921), American singer
Anthony Cary, 5th Viscount of Falkland (1656–1694), Scottish nobleman
Caitlin Cary (born 1968), American country singer
Charles P. Cary (1856–1943), American educator
Constance Cary Harrison (1843–1920), American writer
Diana Serra Cary (1918–2020), American actress
Diane Cary, American actress
Dick Cary (1916–1994), American jazz musician
Elizabeth Cary, Lady Falkland (1584–1639), English poet, translator and dramatist
Elizabeth Cabot Agassiz, born Elizabeth Cabot Cary, (1822–1907), American educator
Columba Cary-Elwes (1903–1994), British monk
Frank T. Cary (1920–2006), American businessman
Glover H. Cary (1885–1936), member of the U.S. House of Representatives from Kentucky
Henry Cary (disambiguation), several people
Hetty Cary (1836–1892), known for making the first three battle flags of the Confederacy
Henry Howard Cary (1908–1991), founder of Applied Physics Corporation (Cary Instruments)
John Cary (1754–1835), British cartographer
John Cary (born 1953), American physicist specializing in particle accelerators, plasma physics, and computational physics. Professor University of Colorado Boulder  and Founder of Tech-X corporation 
Joyce Cary (1888–1957), Irish novelist and artist
Liam Cary (born 1947), American Catholic bishop
Lott Cary (1780–1828), African-American Baptist minister
Lucius Cary, 2nd Viscount Falkland (c. 1610–1643), English politician, soldier and author
Lucius Cary, 10th Viscount Falkland (1803–1884), British colonial administrator
Lucius Cary, 15th Viscount Falkland (born 1935), British Liberal Democrat politician
Mary Ann Shadd (1823–1893), Quaker and social reformer, married name Cary
Patrick Cary (c. 1623-1657), English poet, son of 1st Viscount Falkland
Phillip Cary (born 1958), American Augustine scholar and philosophy professor
Phoebe Cary (1824–1871), American poet
Pierre Cary (1793-1857), French landowner and politician
Reby Cary (1920-2018), American politician and writer
Robert Cary (priest) (c. 1615 – 1688), English chronologist
Robert Webster Cary (1890–1967), U.S. Medal of Honor recipient
Sam Carey (disappeared 1903), American fugitive
Samuel Fenton Cary (1814–1900), American politician and prohibitionist
Tristram Cary (1925–2008), English composer
Trumbull Cary (1787–1869), New York politician
W. Sterling Cary (1927–2021), American Christian minister

See also
List of people with surname Carey, a similar name

Cari (name)

References